The Conemaugh Township Area School District covers the Borough of Benson and Conemaugh Township and the western portion of Paint Township in Somerset County, Pennsylvania. The district encompasses approximately 53 square miles. According to 2000 federal census data, it serves a resident population of 8,746.

Schools
The district operates a primary school, an intermediate school and a junior/senior high school

 Conemaugh Township Area Elementary School (Grades K-5)1516 Tire Hill Rd.Johnstown, Pennsylvania 15905
 Conemaugh Township Area Middle/Senior High School (Grades 6-12)300 W. Campus Av.Davidsville, Pennsylvania 15928

References

External links
 Conemaugh Township Area School District
 Penna. Inter-Scholastic Athletic Assn.

References:

School districts in Somerset County, Pennsylvania